Manfred Wittke (born 2 January 1953) is a former professional German footballer.

Wittke made a total of 2 appearances in the Fußball-Bundesliga and 5 in the 2. Bundesliga during his playing career.

References 
 

1953 births
Living people
German footballers
Association football goalkeepers
Bundesliga players
2. Bundesliga players
Tennis Borussia Berlin players